"You Must Remember This" is the twelfth episode of the seventh season of the American medical drama House. It aired on February 14, 2011.

Plot
When a waitress, Nadia, (portrayed by Tina Holmes) with a perfect memory suffers temporary paralysis, her older sister (Claire Rankin) visits her in the hospital, which triggers high stress levels and even more health complications. The patient's sharp memory proves detrimental when a grudge she's been holding against her sibling gets in the way of receiving proper medical treatment, and Masters discovers that patching a broken sisterhood may prove to be more complex than diagnosing the patient who was finally diagnosed with McLeod syndrome which House came up with from the fact that the patient has a hobby of solving jigsaw puzzles. Meanwhile, Foreman volunteers to help Taub prepare for a medical examination, and House, determined to help Wilson get back in the dating scene, discovers Wilson's secret new companion, a cat named Sara.

References

External links
 "You Must Remember This" at Fox.com
 

House (season 7) episodes
2011 American television episodes